That's What I Like may refer to:
"That's What I Like" (Jive Bunny and the Mastermixers song), 1989
"That's What I Like" (Bruno Mars song), 2017
"That's What I Like", song by Jo Ann Tolley, 1954
"That's What I Like", song written by Styne & Hillard, sung by Dean Martin on album Hey, Brother, Pour the Wine
"That's What I Like", song written by Axton & Reeves, sung by Perry Como on album We Get Letters
"That's What I Like", song by Flo Rida from The Peanuts Movie soundtrack
"That's What I Like", song by Chas & Dave from the album Job Lot